Greek Cusina was a Greek restaurant with two locations in the Portland metropolitan area, in the United States. The restaurants were located in downtown Portland and Tualatin. Both closed in 2010.

Owner Ted Papas blamed the city for the closure. In 2011, Papas led a protest march to City Hall with approximately 50 participants. According to The Oregonian's Anne Saker, " Wearing a black leather jacket with the embroidered image of the Greek Cusina's iconic purple octopus, Papas accused the city of corruption in its efforts to force adherence to the fire code for the space that housed his 36-year-old restaurant."

The steel, foam, and fabric purple octopus which was displayed on the exterior of the downtown restaurant was relocated to Brick's Barber, and later available on Craigslist.

See also

 List of defunct restaurants of the United States
 List of Greek restaurants

References

2010 disestablishments in Oregon
Defunct Greek restaurants
Defunct European restaurants in Portland, Oregon
Greek restaurants in Oregon
Greek-American culture in Portland, Oregon
Restaurants disestablished in 2010
Southwest Portland, Oregon
Tualatin, Oregon
Defunct European restaurants in Oregon